The 1963 Boston Red Sox season was the 63rd season in the franchise's Major League Baseball history. The Red Sox finished seventh in the American League (AL) with a record of 76 wins and 85 losses, 28 games behind the AL champion New York Yankees.

Offseason 
 November 26, 1962: Glenn Beckert was drafted from the Red Sox by the Chicago Cubs in the 1962 first-year draft.
 November 26, 1962: Joe Foy was drafted by the Boston Red Sox from the Minnesota Twins in the 1962 minor league draft.

Regular season

Season standings

Record vs. opponents

Opening Day lineup

Notable transactions 
 April 1963: Bob Smith was purchased by the Red Sox from the St. Louis Cardinals.
 August 14, 1963: Jim Lonborg was signed as an amateur free agent by the Red Sox.

Roster

Player stats

Batting

Starters by position 
Note: Pos = Position; G = Games played; AB = At bats; H = Hits; Avg. = Batting average; HR = Home runs; RBI = Runs batted in

Other batters 
Note: G = Games played; AB = At bats; H = Hits; Avg. = Batting average; HR = Home runs; RBI = Runs batted in

Pitching

Starting pitchers 
Note: G = Games pitched; IP = Innings pitched; W = Wins; L = Losses; ERA = Earned run average; SO = Strikeouts

Other pitchers 
Note: G = Games pitched; IP = Innings pitched; W = Wins; L = Losses; ERA = Earned run average; SO = Strikeouts

Relief pitchers 
Note: G = Games pitched; W = Wins; L = Losses; SV = Saves; ERA = Earned run average; SO = Strikeouts

Awards and honors 
Carl Yastrzemski, Gold Glove Award (OF)

All-Star Game
Bill Monbouquette, reserve P
Carl Yastrzemski, reserve OF

Farm system 

Source:

References

External links
1963 Boston Red Sox team page at Baseball Reference
1963 Boston Red Sox season at baseball-almanac.com

Boston Red Sox seasons
Boston Red Sox
Boston Red Sox
1960s in Boston